Almagalan (also Romanized as Ālmāgalan; also known as Rostam Qeshlāqī) is a village in Fuladlui Jonubi Rural District, Hir District, Ardabil County, Ardabil Province, Iran. At the 2006 census, its population was 50, in 9 families.

References 

Towns and villages in Ardabil County